The Fish Market is a 1659 oil on canvas painting by Adriaen van Ostade. It has been described as a post-Rembrandtesque work from van Ostade's mature period, showing a major theme in Flemish painting, urban markets.

It was bought by the Louvre Museum in 1801 during a public sale of paintings brought to Paris from Flanders and the Netherlands by Alexandre Joseph Paillet and Cloclers. It is still held there as INV 1681.

References

Paintings by Adriaen van Ostade
1659 paintings
Genre paintings
Paintings in the Louvre by Dutch, Flemish and German artists
Fish in art